Cyrus Miles (April 13, 1828March 2, 1877) was a Michigan politician.

Early life
Miles was born on April 13, 1828 in Fowler, New York. In 1852, Miles moved to Port Huron, Michigan.

Career
Miles was a lawyer. In 1856, Miles entered the banking business in Port Huron. Miles was the mayor of Port Huron from 1864 to 1865. On November 8, 1864, Miles was elected to the Michigan House of Representatives where he represented the St. Clair County 2nd district from January 4, 1865 to December 31, 1866. On November 3, 1868, Miles was again elected to the state house where he represented the same district again from January 6, 1869 to December 31, 1870.

Death
Miles died on March 2, 1877.

References

1828 births
1877 deaths
People from St. Lawrence County, New York
People from Port Huron, Michigan
Mayors of places in Michigan
Democratic Party members of the Michigan House of Representatives
19th-century American lawyers
19th-century American politicians